Europa is a station of the Brescia Metro, in the city of Brescia in northern Italy. The station is located on the west side of Viale Europa at Via Branze, near the Faculties of Medicine and Engineering of the University of Brescia.

References

Brescia Metro stations
Railway stations opened in 2013
2013 establishments in Italy
Railway stations in Italy opened in the 21st century